SCONUL (Society of College, National and University Libraries) is the membership organisation for all academic and national libraries in the UK and Ireland.

History
SCONUL was founded in 1950 as the Standing Conference of National and University Libraries. In 1994 when British polytechnics became universities it merged with COPOL, the Council of Polytechnic Librarians, and in 2001 it extended its membership to libraries of Colleges of Higher Education and changed to its current name.

Aims
SCONUL states its aims as:

For the benefit of our libraries and their users we aim:
 to promote the sharing and development of good practice
 to influence policy makers and encourage debate
 to raise the profile of higher education and national libraries

Activities
SCONUL's activities include advocacy for the higher education library community, training and sharing best practice, making arrangements for reciprocal access to libraries, and the collection of statistics.

SCONUL groups are made up by representatives from the member institutions. Groups include the Content Strategy Group, Organisational Development Strategy Group, Technology and Markets Strategy Group, Trends and Futures Strategy Group and the Services Steering Group.

Structure

Its members include libraries in higher education institutions (not only universities but also higher education colleges and specialist schools and conservatoires); the British Library and the National Libraries of Ireland, Scotland and Wales; and libraries in national museums and other specialist institutions.

SCONUL is governed by its members whose Representatives meet twice a year, and between meetings by an elected Executive Board. SCONUL is a registered charity.

The SCONUL Executive Director, from 13 September 2010, is Ann Rossiter and the SCONUL office is based at 94 Euston Street, London, UK, NW1 2HA.

References

External links

Library associations in the United Kingdom